Bollington F.C. was an English association football club, from Bollington, near Macclesfield, Cheshire.

History

Although claiming a foundation date of 1875, the club does not appear to have been particularly active, until entering the Cheshire Senior Cup in 1883, losing in the first round to Macclesfield St John's.

FA Cup entries

Despite being a minor team even within Cheshire, in 1885, Bollington entered the FA Cup and was drawn to play Oswestry at home.  The club was let down by its finishing; Bollington "had the best of the play, but weak shooting rendered every run useless,showing the great contrast to Oswestry, who seldom missed a good chance". The final score was 5-0, four coming in the first half.  The club lost in the second round of the Cheshire Cup to Davenham.  

Undaunted, the club entered again the 1886-87, receiving the same draw; this time Bollington moved the tie to Macclesfield, being rewarded with a crowd of 700, but Oswestry won 8-2, scoring in the second minute and, like the previous year, being 4-0 up at the break.  Bollington also exited the Cheshire Cup at the second round for the second consecutive year, although the club played for 80 minutes with ten men after outside-left winger Arden had his eye infected by lime from the boundary lines when the ball was kicked in his face.

Local years

The club did not enter the FA Cup again and concentrated on the local scene.  Although the club again lost in the second round in the Cheshire Cup in 1887-88, it was only by 3-2 to Chester.  However the gap between Bollington and the top clubs in the county was shown by their first round exit in the Cheshire Cup in 1888-89 to Crewe Alexandra by nine goals to two.

Nevertheless the club was still good enough to beat Manchester Association 8-0 at the start of the 1889-90 season. It was however a false dawn; the club lost in the first round of the Cheshire Cup to Over Wanderers 6-1, and the club seems to have ceased operations soon afterwards, as there are no further reports of matches or entries to the local cup.

Colours

The club gave its colours as maroon, the same as neighbours Davenham.

References

Defunct football clubs in England
Defunct football clubs in Cheshire
Association football clubs disestablished in the 19th century